Adavad  or Adawad is a village in the Chopda tehsil of Jalgaon district, Maharashtra, India. Adawad is situated at base of the Satpuda Hills.

References 

Villages in Jalgaon district